Judicial Assistance is the admittance and enforcement of a judicial order or request by a court from one jurisdiction to a court in another jurisdiction.  Such admittance sometimes requires a treaty between the governments of the two jurisdictions.  Without a treaty, judicial assistance can also take place in individual case on an ad hoc basis. In common law jurisdictions, if a judicial assistance treaty is not in effect then the extra-jurisdictional order may be only admitted as evidence in separate litigation covering the same matter.

Common Orders in Judicial Assistance
 Service of documents
 Taking evidence
 Marriage license & Divorce
 Arbitration award
 Lien
 Damages
 Liquidation

See also
Letter rogatory
Mutual legal assistance treaty

References

Conflict of laws
Common law legal terminology
International law
Assistance